Switzerland's Roger Federer and Stanislas Wawrinka defeated Sweden's Simon Aspelin and Thomas Johansson in the final, 6–3, 6–4, 6–7(4–7), 6–3 to win the gold medal in men's doubles tennis at the 2008 Summer Olympics. In the bronze medal match, the United States' Bob Bryan and Mike Bryan defeated France's Arnaud Clément and Michaël Llodra, 3–6, 6–3, 6–4. It was Sweden's and the United States' first medals in the event since 1988.

The tournament was held from August 10 to August 16 at the Olympic Green Tennis Centre, in Beijing, China. The DecoTurf surface rendered the event a hardcourt tournament. There were 32 pairs from 24 nations.

Chile's Fernando González and Nicolas Massú were the reigning gold medalists from 2004, but they lost in the first round to Russia's Dmitry Tursunov and Mikhail Youzhny.

Background

This was the 13th appearance of men's doubles tennis. The event has been held at every Summer Olympics where tennis has been on the program: from 1896 to 1924 and then from 1988 to the current program. A demonstration event was held in 1968.

The American pair of the Bryan brothers, Bob Bryan and Mike Bryan, were the top seed in 2004 but had exited in the quarterfinals. They were again the number one seed in Beijing. The 2004 gold winning pair of Fernando González and Nicolás Massú returned, as did German silver medalists Nicolas Kiefer and Rainer Schüttler and Indian fourth-place finishers Mahesh Bhupathi and Leander Paes. 2000 gold medalist Daniel Nestor of Canada competed once again with his 2004 partner, Frédéric Niemeyer. Each of the Big Four competed, but expectations of them in the doubles were not particularly high.

Serbia made its debut in the event. France and Great Britain each made their 10th appearance in the event, tied for most of all nations.

Qualification

Qualification for the men's doubles was primarily through the ATP ranking list of 9 June 2008. Nations had been able to enter two pairs (four players) in the event since the 2004 Games. Each nation was limited to a total of 6 male players in the singles and doubles events combined, so nations with 4 singles players could add only 2 more in doubles. The men's doubles draw was 32 pairs (64 players), with most of the pairs coming from the singles event where nations had 2 or 4 players. There were 10 quota places for direct qualification to the doubles event, based on world ranking. The ITF allocated 12 places based on ranking and continental and national representation (bringing the total number of male tennis players to 86).

Competition format

The competition was a single-elimination tournament with a bronze medal match. Matches were best-of-3 sets, except for the final which was best-of-5 sets. Tiebreakers were not played in the final set.

Schedule

Seeds

Draw

Key

 INV = Tripartite Invitation
 IP = ITF place
 ALT = Alternate

 r = Retired
 w/o = Walkover

Finals

Top half

Bottom half

External links

Draw

2008
Men's Doubles
Men's events at the 2008 Summer Olympics